MTBS is an annual interschools athletics competition (the largest in South Africa) held between four high schools located in Bellville, Western Cape. 
The competition is mainly an athletics meeting and includes  cheerleading  and  flashes. These schools are: D.F. Malan High School, Tygerberg High School, Bellville High School and Stellenberg High School. 
The name is a derived acronym from the names of the schools in that order. The first MTBS took place in 1994. This was the brain child of the late Frans du Toit, a retired teacher from JG Meiring High School in Goodwood and a part time sports journalist.

The flashes consist of each school showing theirs images while sitting on the pavilion. 
This performance (named flashes) consists of a medley of songs during which the pupils  create a "human LCD screen" on the pavilion. This is achieved by them opening and closing their school blazer at unique pre-determined moments, with each student effectively functioning as a pixel and thus allowing images and animations to be displayed. 
Other parts of the school uniform (such as dresses and socks) may also be used, but no other props (such as cards) are allowed.  Each school' adheres to a specific theme that has been chosen by that particular school.
The annual attendance is an estimated  12,000 spectators.  The athletics and flashes are attended by the whole community.  It receives coverage  by South African newspapers Die Burger, Tygerburger and Rapport. It has also been  broadcast  on national television channel SABC 2. Similar events exist: most notably in South Korea.
Different athletics items take place throughout the day; including short distance sprints, long distance running, hurdles  shot put, javelin, long jump, discus, high jump, triple jump and relay races. Two athletes from each school take part in an event, adding up to 8 athletes in each event. 

Points are rewarded as follows:
 8th place - 1 point
 7th Place - 2 points
 6th place - 3 points
 5th place - 4 points
 4th place - 5 points
 3rd place -  6 points
 2nd place -7 points
 1st place - 9 points

Awards for each age group are rewarded at the end of the day.

From 1994 until 2016, there were only 2 categories (Athletics and Flashes) in the competition. (excl. 2004, 2005, 2015, 2016)  The Athletics cup is awarded to the school with the highest total score, according to the scoring system.  The Flashes and Best Spirit is independently judge. If a school won both it is called  "double gold". In 2017 the Best spirit category was added. If a school won all three it is called “triple gold”. 

Times won :

Double gold :

Consecutive wins :

References

External links
DF Malan Kreet 2013, Theme: On The Move
Stellenberg Kreet 2011, Theme: Medical Madness
South Korean event similar to MTBS

Sports competitions in South Africa